The Nursing Association of Nepal is the national governing body of nurses in Nepal.  The central office is located in Kathmandu.  It is a member of the International Council of Nurses.

See also
List of nursing organizations

Nursing organizations
Medical and health organisations based in Nepal